Radka Popova (born 26 January 1974) is a Bulgarian biathlete. She competed at the 1998 Winter Olympics and the 2006 Winter Olympics.

References

1974 births
Living people
Biathletes at the 1998 Winter Olympics
Biathletes at the 2006 Winter Olympics
Bulgarian female biathletes
Olympic biathletes of Bulgaria
Place of birth missing (living people)
21st-century Bulgarian women